Prince Fatafehi Tuʻipelehake (Sione Ngū Manumataongo; 7 January 1922 – 10 April 1999) was the youngest son of Queen Sālote Tupou III and was educated in Tonga and Australia. Tu'ipelehake is a traditional very high-ranking Tongan title. He was the 5th Tu'ipelehake.

Biography 
Tuʻi Pelehake attended Newington College, Sydney, (1941–1942) and Gatton Agricultural College, Queensland, Australia.  Fatafehi married Melenaite Tupoumoheofo Veikune (13 November 1924 – 16 March 1993) on the same day as his older brother, the Crown Prince (in that time still called Tupoutoa-Tungī) married Halaevalu Mataʻaho ʻAhomeʻe. That was the famous double royal wedding (taane māhanga) of 10 June 1947. He received the title Tui Pelehake (Fatafehi) from his mother (Queen Salote) in 1944, and he also received the runner up highest title of Tonga of Tui Faleua (king of the second house).

From a non-traditional side, he was conferred an honorary CBE in 1966. He inherited from his mother an artistic side; he was a well-known poet and composer.

His career was with his brother in the government. His first assignment was as governor of Vavaʻu (1949–1952), later of Haʻapai (1952–1953), and he then served as Minister of Health and Lands. In 1965 he took over as Prime Minister of Tonga when his brother had to vacate the post on becoming king. He remained in this post until he had to withdraw in 1991 because of serious health problems. His last years were spent in a wheelchair on a life support system.

He kept the both titles of Tui Pelehake and Tui Faleua for so many years, that they became synonymous with him. But after his death, only the former was conferred to his son ʻUluvalu, while the latter returned to the king.

He died on 10 April 1999 in Auckland after a long illness.

Descent 
Besides his son who inherited his positions, he also had four daughters and two sons : 
 Princess Mele Siu’ilikutapu
 Princess 'Elisiva Fusipala Vaha'i, 
 Prince 'Uluvalu Takeivulangi (Late Tu‘ipelehake),
 Princess Lavinia Mata 'o Taone Ma‘afu, 
 Princess Sinaitakala 'Ofeina-'e-he Langi Fakafanua, who is the mother of the Crown Princess of Tonga Princess Sinaitakala Tuku'aho whom she married her double second cousin the son of queen consort, Queen Nansipau'u and Tupou VI, the Crown Prince Tupoutoʻa ʻUlukalala.
 Prince Viliami Tupoulahi Mailefihi (Late 6th Tu'ipelehake).
Prince Tu'ipelehake (formerly Viliami Sione Ngu Takeivulai Tuku'aho, the only son of late Tu'ipelehake Mailefihi) has two children with Cassandra Vaea. Prince Tu'ipelehake were wedded but are now divorced. They have two children: a son, Siaosi Tupoulahi Tu'ipelehake and a daughter, Melenaite Tupoumoheofo Tu'ipelehake.

Honours

National
 : Knight Grand Cross with Collar of the Royal Order of Pouono
 : Knight Grand Cross of the Order of the Crown of Tonga
 : Recipient of the Royal Tongan Medal of Merit
 : Recipient of the King Tāufaʻāhau Tupou IV Silver Jubilee Medal

Foreign
 : Knight Commander of the Order of the British Empire (1977)
: Recipient of the Queen Elizabeth II Coronation Medal

References

1922 births
1999 deaths
People educated at Newington College
Prime Ministers of Tonga
Government ministers of Tonga
Tongan royalty
Honorary Knights Commander of the Order of the British Empire
Governors of Vavaʻu
People from Nukuʻalofa
University of Queensland alumni
Tongan expatriates in Australia
Ministers of Health of Tonga
Foreign ministers of Tonga
Sons of monarchs